Bam Airport is an airport to the east of Bam, Iran .

Airlines and destinations

References

Airports in Iran
Transportation in Kerman Province
Buildings and structures in Kerman Province